The 1999 Louisiana–Monroe Indians football team represented the University of Louisiana at Monroe as an independent during the 1999 NCAA Division I-A football season. Led by first-year head coach Bobby Keasler, the Indians compiled a record of 5–6. Louisiana–Monroe's offense scored 186 points while the defense allowed 322 points. The team played home games at Malone Stadium in Monroe, Louisiana.

Schedule

References

Louisiana–Monroe
Louisiana–Monroe Warhawks football seasons
Louisiana–Monroe Indians football